Sit Stand Kneel Prey is the fifth studio album by American thrash metal band Whiplash. It was released in September 1997 via Massacre Records and comes only one year after their previous album, Cult of One.

Vocalist Rob Gonzo's stay was short-lived and Warren Conditi stepped in to take up vocal as well as guitar duties. Tony Scaglione also left and was replaced by Bob Candella on drums – leaving Portaro as the only remaining Tony of the original Tony trio. The band's next album, Thrashback, was to see a reunion of the original line-up, however.

Track listing
"Climb Out of Hell" – 4:14  
"Left Unsaid" – 4:08  
"Hitlist" – 3:52  
"Cyanide Grenade" – 4:12  
"Jane Doe" – 4:14  
"Knock Me Down" – 5:25  
"Lack of Contrition" – 5:55  
"Word to the Wise" – 4:11  
"Strangeface" – 5:13  
"Catharsis" – 1:21  
"Sit, Stand, Kneel, Prey" – 6:47

Credits
 Warren Conditi – vocals, guitar, keyboards
 Tony Portaro – guitar
 James Preziosa – bass
 Bob Candella – drums

References

External links
Massacre Records album page
Roadrunner Records band page
BNR Metal discography page
Encyclopaedia Metallum album entry

1997 albums
Whiplash (band) albums
Massacre Records albums
Albums produced by Steve Evetts